Zallascht Sadat (born 12 April 1986) is an Afghan-German model who has won several pageants in recent years. Her most recent win was the Miss Globe 2012 title.

Biography
Zallascht Sadat studied business administration in Frankfurt, Germany at the Frankfurt University of Applied Sciences. She created her own non-profit organization the Zallascht Sadat Afghanistan Foundation to support women and children in Afghanistan. Zallascht lives between Germany and Qatar.

Pageants
Sadat entered and won her first pageant at the Miss Afghanistan 2008–2009 pageant. The pageant was held in Hamburg, Germany due to the volatile situation in Afghanistan at that time. She is the first officially elected Miss Afghanistan since Zohra Yousuf Daoud was elected Miss Afghanistan in 1972. In 2010 she won the Miss Hessen 2010 and Miss Süddeutschland 2010 pageants which led to her entry to the Miss Deutschland 2010 pageant which she subsequently won. She was crowned Miss Deutschland 2010. She kept the Miss Deutschland title the following year since pageant was not held in 2011. In 2012 Zallascht entered the Miss Globe contest held by the World Beauty Organization and won that pageant. She was crowned Miss Globe 2012.

References

External links

 

1986 births
Living people
Afghan beauty pageant winners
Frankfurt University of Applied Sciences alumni
People from Kabul
Afghan female models
German beauty pageant winners
German female models
Afghan emigrants to Germany
Pashtun people
20th-century Afghan women
21st-century Afghan women